Valerii redirects to Valeria (gens), a patrician family at Rome, prominent from the very beginning of the Republic to the latest period of the Empire.

It may refer to:

 Valerius, Ancient Roman family

Given name
 Valerii Kichin (born 1992), Kyrgyzstani footballer
Valerii Zaluzhnyi, chief of Ukraine's armed forces

Surname
 Tonino Valerii (born 1934), Italian film director

See also